Michael V. E. "Misha" Glenny (born 25 April 1958) is a British journalist and broadcaster, specialising in southeast Europe, global organised crime, and cybersecurity. He is multilingual. He is also the writer and producer of the BBC Radio 4 series, How to Invent a Country.

Early life
Glenny was born in Kensington, London, the son of Juliet Mary Crum and Michael Glenny, a Russian studies academic. Glenny described his ancestry as "three-quarters Anglo-Celtic and a quarter Jewish".

Education 
He was educated at Magdalen College School in Oxford and studied at the University of Bristol and Prague's Charles University before becoming Central Europe correspondent for The Guardian and later the BBC. He specialised in reporting on the Yugoslav Wars in the early 1990s that followed the breakup of Yugoslavia. While at the BBC, Glenny won Sony special award in 1993's Radio Academy Awards for his "outstanding contribution to broadcasting". He has published three books about Central and Eastern Europe.

Career 
In McMafia (2008), he wrote that international organised crime could account for 15% of the world's GDP. Glenny advised the US and some European governments on policy issues and for three years ran an NGO helping with the reconstruction of Serbia, Macedonia and Kosovo. Glenny appeared in the documentary film, Raw Opium: Pain, Pleasure, Profits (2011).

Glenny's later books continue an interest in international crime. DarkMarket (2011) concerns cybercrime and the activities of hackers involved in phishing and other activities. Nemesis: One Man and the Battle for Rio (2015) about the leading Brazilian drug trafficker Antônio Francisco Bonfim Lopes (known as "Nem") in Rocinha ("Little farm"), a favela (slum).

From January 2012, Glenny was visiting professor at Columbia University's Harriman Institute, teaching a course on "crime in transition". In an interview in October 2011, he also spoke about his new book, DarkMarket; assessing cybercriminals with Simon Baron-Cohen at Cambridge; the Stuxnet cyberattack which resulted in "gloves off" attention from governments; and other more recent cyberattacks.

Glenny was an executive producer of the BBC One eight-part drama series, McMafia, inspired by his non-fiction book of the same name (2008).

Glenny is a producer and the writer of the BBC Radio 4 series, How to Invent a Country,  also made available as a podcast. An audio book of the same name was published by Penguin Random House in January 2021, consisting of the series' first 28 episodes broadcast October 2011–March 2019.

In 2019, Glenny presented a podcast on the life of Vladimir Putin titled Putin: Prisoner of Power.

In 2022, Glenny presented a five-part series, The Scramble for Rare Earths, on BBC Radio 4. In the programmes he says, “In this series I’m finding out why the battle for a small group of metals and critical raw materials is central to rising geopolitical tensions around the world.”

Personal life
Glenny is married to British journalist and broadcaster Kirsty Lang and has three children, two by his first wife (their daughter took her own life in 2014) and one by Lang.

Publications
 The Rebirth Of History: Eastern Europe in the Age of Democracy (1991) 
 The Fall of Yugoslavia: The Third Balkan War (1992; revised in 1996) 
 The Balkans: Nationalism, War and the Great Powers, 1804–1999 (1999; revised 2012) 
 McMafia: A Journey Through the Global Criminal Underworld (2008) 
 DarkMarket: Cyberthieves, Cybercops and You (2011) 
 Nemesis: One Man and the Battle for Rio (2015)

See also
 True crime

References

External links

 
 
 Bibliography, New York Review of Books
 London Review of Books articles

1958 births
Living people
Alumni of the University of Bristol
British foreign policy writers
British historians
British male journalists
British people of Russian descent
Organized crime writers
People educated at Magdalen College School, Oxford
Charles University alumni
People from Kensington